Rathore, is a Rajput clan found in Northern India.

Subclans 
Jodhana, Vadhel, Jaitawat, Kumpawat, Champawat, Meratiya, Udawat, Karamsot etc. are the branches or subclans of Rathore Rajputs.

Coverage 
This article discusses the "Kanaujiya" Rathores of Marwar and lineages, thereof; Norman Ziegler had noted of 12 other similar branches ("shakhas") of Rathores — Sur, Shir, Kapaliya, Kherada, Abhepura, Jevamt, Vagula, Karaha, Parakra, Ahrao, Jalkheda, and Camdel. Scholarship about those branches are scarce to non-existent.

Origins 
A section of historians argue for a Rashtrakuta origin. Branches of Rashtrakutas had migrated to Western Rajasthan as early as late tenth century; multiple inscriptions of "Rathauras" have been located in and around Marwar dating from tenth to thirteenth century; the Rathores may have emerged from one of the Rashtrakuta branches.

Bardic origins 
Muhnot Nainsi, employed by the Rathores of Marwar, chronicled Nainsi ri Khyat, a bardic genealogical history of the Rajputs in western Rajasthan c. 1660; one of the oldest extant historical records of the region, the Khyata collated information from existing oral literature, genealogies and administrative sources in a chronological fashion. Nainsi had noted of the Rathores to have originated from Kannauj before migrating to Marwar.

Accuracy 
These bardic claims of descent have been since deemed to be largely ahistorical by Ziegler. Ziegler notes the theme of migrations to be common across Rajput genealogies; a construct, borrowed from literary cannon of other regions. Later genealogies of Rathores went as far as to derive origin from Gods of the Hindu pantheon — Indra, Narayana et al.

History

Early history
The first Rathore chieftain was Siho Setramot, grandson of the last Gahadavala king Jayachandra. Then known as Raja Singhsen, Setramot abdicated the throne of Kanauj to become an ascetic but got embroiled in a royal rivalry and eventually married the daughter of a Gujarati ruler, who birthed him three sons. Asthan, the eldest, was raised at Paltan after Siho's death (at Kanauj) and he went on to establish the first Rathore polity in Pali (and few adjoining villages), after winning over the local Brahmins by defeating an oppressive king named Kanha Mer. Other contemporary sources claim the same descent and construct slightly variable narratives about migration from Kanauj: Setramot fled the Ghurid Sultanate to Marwar and established the first Rathore polity. The Bithoor inscription provides the date of Siho's death in 1273 CE and calls him the son of Set Kunwar, however it does not claim any Gaharwal origin. 

Under Asthan's regime, and that of his successor-rulers, the Rathore territories significantly expanded courtesy confrontations and diplomatic negotiations with other pastoral groups; the primary base shifted multiple times. Marital alliances with any warrior-group operating out of Thar were especially favored and they were welcome to be inducted in the Rathore fold. Multiple new Rathore branches seem to have split out in these spans. 

The precise accuracy of events which allegedly occurred across these spans is questionable and may not be relied upon except for a generic reconstruction.

Sovereignty 
Chunda, who was ninth in descent from Asthan, married a Pratihara princess and was gifted the territory of Mandore as a dowry by the Pratihara clan. In return Chunda promised to defend Mandore against the Tughlaq Empire. Mandore thus became the new capital of the Rathore clan, c. 1400. This prompted a significant sociopolitical shift: the hitherto nomadic lifestyle frequented with cattle raids etc. would gradually give way to landed aristocracy. His son Ranmal was assassinated in 1438; Marwar was annexed by Sisodias whilst other parts were captured by Delhi Sultanate. 

In 1453, Rao Jodha regained Marwar, and expanded his territories by entering into multiple alliances with fellow Rajputs; the Jodhawat line was established with his consecration of a new capital at Jodhpur. Rao Jodha was successful in annexing several territories from the Delhi Sultanate, due to which the Rathores of Marwar became the most powerful kingdom in Rajputana during his reign.  Among his sons, Rao Bika found a new state in Bikaner in 1465; he and his successors would go on to expand territories therefrom, adopting similar tactics. This Bikawat branch became the new bearer of Rathore legacy, even bringing Gahdavala-time emblems and heirlooms from Marwar. Another of Jodha's sons Rao Varsingh found a new state at Merto in 1462, establishing the Mertiyo branch. 

Rao Maldeo's regime (1532-1562) harbored another significant shift from clannish rule to monarchy; Malde forced his distant relatives, who conquered new territories, to submit to him or else be deprived of gains. Bikaner was raided, too. Large palaces were constructed and fortifications were committed to, in what signaled the effective end of pastoral lifestyle. By mid-sixteenth century, the Rathors had a firm hold over entire Rajasthan. 

All these while, multiple matrimonial and military alliances with local Islamic kingdoms; the Delhi Sultanate have been noted; Hindu-Muslim relations were largely fraternal.

Mughal period 
The situations deteriorated once Akbar was ordained as the Mughal Emperor, and rao Maldeo died. His son rao Chandrasen Rathore defended his kingdom for nearly two decades against relentless attacks from the Mughal Empire. The Jodhawat Rathores lost much of their territory rapidly and were effectively subsumed. The Bikawat Rathores entered into friendly relations with the Mughals, led their armies, and were extensively patronaged to the extent of being allowed to control the Jodhpur Fort. In 1583, Uday Singh finally accepted Mughal suzerainty and in return, was granted part of a Pargana in Jodhpur; this would enable the Jodhawat Rathores to become all-weather allies of the Mughals though punctuated with discords. 

This span of cohabitation led to the introduction of strict endogamy into Rathore folds and hypergamy with Mughals. It was also under the Mughals, that bardic genealogies were crafted to present themselves as worthy appointees of the Mughals and distinguish themselves from other "once-fraternal" communities, thereby staking a claim to power irrespective of temporal situations. Also, by this time, the nomadic memories were better suppressed and the Rathores had themselves rebranded as the elite "protectors" of local cattle-rearers; in a couple of centuries, figures from early Rathore polity would be deified.

British period
The Rathore ruler of Jodhpur Man Singh, initially refused to form treaties with the British. However in 1805-1806 he approached the British for military advice and paid the British to protect his state against the predatory actions of the Marathas and Pindaris. By 1816 the British changed this treaty and expelled all foreign influence in Jodhpur, they also started arbitrating in state matters. By 1818 the alliance was cemented and in 1832 the Rajputana agency was formed. The Rathore raja Man Singh was not always cordial with the British during this time, in 1829 Man Singh gave shelter to Mudhoji II Bhonsle and antagonized the British. Mudhoji was zealously protected by Man Singh and lived his remaining life in Jodhpur till his death in 1840. The 1857 rebellion sparked uprisings amongst several Rajput chieftains of the Rathore clan in Jodhpur State. Prominent amongst them was Kushal Singh of Auwa. After several failed attempts by the British, the rebellion was quelled by the British army under the command of Brigadier Holmes.

During the 20th century the lower castes in India tried to uplift their social standing by adopting surnames of other castes. The Rajput clan name "Rathore" was adopted as a surname by the Teli community in 1931, who started calling themselves Rathore Vaishyas for caste upliftment.  During the same period of British Raj, the Banjaras began styling themselves as Chauhan and Rathor Rajputs.

Princely states
The various cadet branches of the Rathore clan gradually spread to encompass all of Marwar and later founded states in Central India and Gujarat. The Marwar Royal family is considered the head house of Rathores. At the time of India's independence in 1947, the princely states ruled by various branches of the Rathore clan included: 

Jodhpur (Marwar) in present-day Rajasthan, founded in 1226 by Rao Siha.
Bikaner in present-day Rajasthan, founded in 1465 by Rao Bikaji (son of Rao Jodha).
Kishangarh in present-day Rajasthan, founded in 1611 by Maharaja Kishan Singh.
Idar in present-day Gujarat, founded in 1729 by Rao Anand Singh.
Ratlam in present-day Madhya Pradesh, founded in 1651 by Maharaja Ratan Singh.
Jhabua in present-day Madhya Pradesh, founded in 1584 by Raja Keshav Das.
Sitamau in present-day Madhya Pradesh, founded 1701 by Raja Kesho Das.
Sailana in present-day Madhya Pradesh, founded in 1730 by Raja Jai Singh.
Alirajpur in present-day Madhya Pradesh, founded in 1437 by Raja Anand Deo.

Notes

References

Further reading

 

Rajput clans of Rajasthan
Rajput clans of Uttar Pradesh
Rajput clans of Madhya Pradesh